The members of the Parliament of Fiji from 1982 to 1987 consisted of members of the House of Representatives elected between 10 and 17 July 1982, and members of the nominated Senate.

House of Representatives

Senate

References

 1982